Gary Cohen (born ) is an American sportscaster, best known as a radio and television play-by-play announcer for the New York Mets of Major League Baseball.

Cohen currently calls Mets broadcasts for SNY and WPIX and Seton Hall basketball games on WMCA and WNYM.

Career

Cohen graduated with a political science degree in 1981 from Columbia University, where he began his broadcasting career with WKCR Sports. While at Columbia, he announced soccer games with future presidential adviser and Good Morning America host George Stephanopoulos.

He also called ice hockey and basketball games for Providence College from 1988 to 1989, and football for Brown University in 1987. Along with his work with the Mets, Cohen has also called postseason MLB games for ESPN Radio and CBS Radio.

In addition to his baseball duties, Cohen has called men's college basketball games for many years, starting with his duties with St. John's on WFAN, for which he broadcast from 1995 to 2002. Following WFAN's loss of the radio rights to St. John's games, Cohen began broadcasting Seton Hall games, which he continues to do to this day. He also served as a backup announcer on New York Rangers radio broadcasts, called Olympic hockey at the 1992, 1994, and 1998 Winter Olympics, and NCAA tournament games for Westwood One on multiple occasions.

In September 2022, Cohen pre-recorded announcements along MTA New York City Transit's 7 line, along with Keith Hernandez and Ron Darling.

Television
It was announced on November 9, 2005, that Cohen would become the play-by-play announcer for the new Mets cable television network, SportsNet New York (SNY).  As part of the agreement, Cohen also calls about 25 Mets games per year on WPIX along with analysts (and former Mets) Ron Darling and Keith Hernandez.

Personal life
He is married to Lynn Cohen, and lives in Connecticut. He has five children.

References

External links

 SportsNet New York Profile of Gary Cohen

1958 births
Living people
American radio sports announcers
American television sports announcers
College basketball announcers in the United States
College football announcers
Jewish American baseball people
Jewish American sportspeople
Major League Baseball broadcasters
Minor League Baseball broadcasters
National Hockey League broadcasters
New York Mets announcers
New York Rangers announcers
Olympic Games broadcasters
Seton Hall Pirates basketball
Sportspeople from Queens, New York
SportsNet New York
Columbia College (New York) alumni
21st-century American Jews